Progress MS-03, identified by NASA as Progress 64P, was a Progress spaceflight operated by Roscosmos to resupply the International Space Station (ISS). It was the first Progress MS to have an external compartment for releasing satellites.

History 
Progress was the first cargo spacecraft to fly in space (1978), and also the first to bring freight back to Earth, thanks to a Raduga capsule. It was developed to supply the Salyut 6 space station and which was subsequently supply the crews of Salyut 7, Mir and from the International Space Station. It enabled space station crews to stay in space by bringing consumables (food, water, fuel, oxygen) and spare parts.

The Progress-MS is a uncrewed freighter based on the Progress-M featuring improved avionics. This improved variant first launched on 21 December 2015. It has the following improvements:

 New external compartment that enables it to deploy satellites. Each compartment can hold up to four launch containers. This Progress MS-03 flight features first usage.
 Enhanced redundancy thanks to the addition of a backup system of electrical motors for the docking and sealing mechanism.
 Improved Micrometeoroid (MMOD) protection with additional panels in the cargo compartment.
 Luch Russian relay satellites link capabilities enable telemetry and control even when not in direct view of ground radio stations.
 GNSS autonomous navigation enables real time determination of the status vector and orbital parameters dispensing with the need of ground station orbit determination.
 Real time relative navigation thanks to direct radio data exchange capabilities with the space station.
 New digital radio that enables enhanced TV camera view for the docking operations.
 The Ukrainian Chezara Kvant-V on board radio system and antenna/feeder system has been replaced with a Unified Command Telemetry System (UCTS).
 Replacement of the Kurs A with Kurs NA digital system.

Pre-launch 
The launch of Progress MS-03 was originally scheduled for on 30 April 2016, but was postponed as a result of an overall reshuffle of the flight manifest for the International Space Station. At the beginning of June 2016, the mission was rescheduled from 4 July to 17 July 2016.

Launch 
Progress MS-03 was launched on 16 July 2016 at 21:41:45 (UTC) on a Soyuz-U from the Baikonur Site 31/6 in Kazakhstan. At the time of launch, the International Space Station was flying at 420 km over Eastern Chad.

Docking 
The Progress MS-03 mission used the two-day, 34-orbit trip to the station instead of the currently available six-hour rendezvous profile. Progress MS-03 docked with the nadir docking port of the Pirs module on 19 July 2016 at 00:20 UTC.

Cargo 
The Progress MS-03 spacecraft delivered 2,425 kg of cargo and supplies to the International Space Station for the six members of the Expedition 48 crew.
The following is a breakdown of cargo bound for the ISS:

 Fuel: 705 kg
 Oxygen and Air: 50 kg
 Water: 420 kg
 Supplies for NASA: 22 kg
 Spare parts: 1,230 kg

Undocking and decay 
The Progress MS-03 cargo ship undocked from the Pirs, on 31 January 2017, at 14:25 UTC, Roskosmos announced. The three-minute braking maneuver was scheduled to begin at 17:34 UTC, followed by reentry into the dense atmosphere at 18:10 UTC. Surviving debris of the spacecraft were calculated to impact the Pacific Ocean at 18:24 UTC on the same day.

References 

Progress (spacecraft) missions
Spacecraft launched in 2016
2016 in Russia
Spacecraft launched by Soyuz-U rockets
Supply vehicles for the International Space Station
Spacecraft which reentered in 2017